Geoff Lord (born ) is an Australian businessman.

Lord first appeared on the BRW Rich 200 in 2005 with a net worth of 115 million. In 2020, Lord's net worth was assessed at 569 million. Lord did not reach the threshold for inclusion on the 2021 Rich List.

Lord is a non-executive director and investor in Judo Capital.

References

External links 
Image of Geoff Lord

Living people
Australian businesspeople
Year of birth missing (living people)